Lovely Choubey (born 3 August 1980) is a female international lawn bowler from India.

Bowls career

Commonwealth Games 
Choubey has represented India at three Commonwealth Games; in the triples and fours at the 2014 Commonwealth Games, in the pairs and fours at the 2018 Commonwealth Games and in the pairs and fours at the 2022 Commonwealth Games. In the 2022 competition, she was part of the Indian Women's fours team, along with (Pinki Singh, Nayanmoni Saikia and Rupa Rani Tirkey) which won Gold beating South Africa in the final, 17-10.

Asian Championships 
Choubey has won a silver medal in the singles as well as the pairs events at the 2014 Asian Lawn Bowls Championship.

In 2023, she won the fours gold medal at the 14th Asian Lawn Bowls Championship in Kuala Lumpur.

References 

1980 births
Living people
Indian bowls players
People from Ranchi
Sportswomen from Jharkhand
Bowls players at the 2014 Commonwealth Games
Bowls players at the 2018 Commonwealth Games
Bowls players at the 2022 Commonwealth Games
Commonwealth Games gold medallists for India
Commonwealth Games medallists in lawn bowls
Medallists at the 2022 Commonwealth Games